Ruifang is a railway station in New Taipei, Taiwan served by Taiwan Railways.

History
The station was opened on 5 May 1919.

Structure
There are two island platforms and one side platform.

See also
 List of railway stations in Taiwan

References

1919 establishments in Taiwan
Railway stations in New Taipei
Railway stations opened in 1919
Railway stations served by Taiwan Railways Administration